The Kawishiwi River is a river of Minnesota.

Kawishiwi is a name derived from the Ojibwe language meaning "the river full of beavers' houses".

See also
List of rivers of Minnesota

References

Minnesota Watersheds
USGS Hydrologic Unit Map - State of Minnesota (1974)

Rivers of Lake County, Minnesota
Rivers of Minnesota